Larropsis is a genus of square-headed wasps in the family Crabronidae. There are more than 40 described species in Larropsis.

Species
These 42 species belong to the genus Larropsis:

 Larropsis arizonensis G.Bohart & R.Bohart, 1966
 Larropsis asiatica (Gussakovskij, 1935)
 Larropsis atra F.Williams, 1914
 Larropsis aurantia (W.Fox, 1891)
 Larropsis bradleyi G.Bohart & R.Bohart, 1962
 Larropsis capax (W.Fox, 1894)
 Larropsis chilopsidis (Cockerell, 1897)
 Larropsis conferta (W.Fox, 1894)
 Larropsis consimilis (W. Fox, 1894)
 Larropsis corrugata G.Bohart & R.Bohart, 1962
 Larropsis deserta G.Bohart & R.Bohart, 1966
 Larropsis discreta (W.Fox, 1894)
 Larropsis distincta (F. Smith, 1856)
 Larropsis divisa (Patton, 1879)
 Larropsis elegans G.Bohart & R.Bohart, 1966
 Larropsis europaea (Mercet, 1910)
 Larropsis europaeae (Mercet, 1910)
 Larropsis filicornis Rohwer, 1911
 Larropsis granulosa G.Bohart & R.Bohart, 1962
 Larropsis greenei Rohwer, 1917
 Larropsis hurdi G.Bohart & R.Bohart, 1962
 Larropsis interoculans G.E.Bohart & R.Bohart, 1966
 Larropsis interocularis G.Bohart & R.Bohart, 1966
 Larropsis lucida G.Bohart & R.Bohart, 1966
 Larropsis obliqua (F.Smith, 1856)
 Larropsis platynota G.Bohart & R.Bohart, 1962
 Larropsis portiana (Rohwer, 1911)
 Larropsis punctulata (Kohl, 1884)
 Larropsis rugosa (W.Fox, 1894)
 Larropsis sericea G.Bohart & R.Bohart, 1966
 Larropsis sericifrons (H.Smith, 1906)
 Larropsis shappirioi G.Bohart & R.Bohart, 1962
 Larropsis snowi G.Bohart & R.Bohart, 1966
 Larropsis sonora G.Bohart & R.Bohart, 1966
 Larropsis sparsa G.Bohart & R.Bohart, 1966
 Larropsis striata G.Bohart & R.Bohart, 1966
 Larropsis tenuicornis (F.Smith, 1856)
 Larropsis testacea G.Bohart & R.Bohart, 1966
 Larropsis texensis G.Bohart & R.Bohart, 1966
 Larropsis uniformis G.Bohart & R.Bohart, 1966
 Larropsis vegeta (W.Fox, 1894)
 Larropsis washoensis G.Bohart & R.Bohart, 1966

References

Crabronidae
Articles created by Qbugbot